There are several positions within the United Nations that have the title President:

 President of the United Nations General Assembly
 President of the United Nations Security Council
 President of the United Nations Economic and Social Council

See also
 World government in fiction#President of Earth